Rabia Siddique (born 25 November 1971) is an Australian criminal and human rights lawyer, retired British Army officer, author, professional speaker and hostage survivor.

In 2008, she successfully sued the UK Ministry of Defence for discrimination after it failed to acknowledge the role she played in the rescue of two captured Special Forces soldiers in war-torn Iraq.

Education and early career 

Rabia Siddique was born in Perth, Western Australia, to an Indian Muslim father and Australian mother. Her early childhood was spent in India and her family returned to Perth when she was five. She attended Manning Primary School and Penrhos College where she was school captain in her final year.

Siddique graduated from the University of Western Australia with a Bachelor of Laws in 1995, and a Bachelor of Arts in 1997.

As a university student, she volunteered for the Aboriginal Legal Services. Her early career included working in Singapore representing prisoners seeking clemency on death row. She returned to Perth to work for the Legal Aid Commission of Western Australia before becoming a Federal Prosecutor with the Commonwealth Director of Public Prosecutions.

Moving to London in 1998, she worked in public liability, and as a criminal defence lawyer.

Military career 

In September 2001 Siddique joined the British Army Legal Services fulfilling an ambition to work in international humanitarian law. In April 2005, after being promoted to the rank of major, Siddique was deployed for a seven-month tour as the sole legal advisor to 12th Mechanised Brigade in Basra, Iraq. As a Muslim able to speak Arabic, Siddique worked closely with Iraqi authorities, earning the trust of local judges and legal officials.

The al-Jameat hostage crisis 

On 19 September 2005, two British Special Forces soldiers were captured and illegally detained while investigating the infiltration of the police force by Shi'ite extremists. They were taken to the Jameat, or al-Jameat, a police compound in the Iraqi port city of Basra.

The head of the UK brigade's surveillance unit, Major James Woodham, was sent to negotiate their release. When talks broke down the Iraqi representative, Judge Raghib, told Woodham he would not discuss the situation with anyone other than "Major Rabia".

Despite having no training in hostage negotiation and little combat experience, Siddique was ordered by her chief-of-staff Major Rupert Jones to negotiate their release. Siddique visited the cell where the British soldiers were held, negotiated for the removal of their hoods and chains and a set of conditions for the men to be released into her custody.  As the document was about to be signed, the compound was stormed by a crowd who had been told by corrupt local police that the Special Forces soldiers were Israeli spies and had slaughtered a local policeman.

The soldiers were chained and blindfolded again and Woodham and Siddique were taken to a tiny office where they were held hostage with police officers, Iraqi elders, and four British soldiers who had been captured while sneaking into the compound.  During the crisis Siddique had an AK47 pointed at her and believed she only had seconds to live.

After almost ten hours Siddique and five other officers were rescued by British Warrior armoured vehicles. They went on to a Hezbollah safe house, rescuing the two British Special Forces soldiers who had been transferred there, and who were about to be beheaded.

Back at headquarters Woodham received a hero's welcome and a standard debriefing.

Siddique was not debriefed and received no acknowledgment of the role she played at al-Jameat.

Military career post al-Jameat and Basra 

Woodham was awarded a Military Cross for bravery in the al-Jameat incident. Siddique was not mentioned in official reports and she was not invited to take part in a Whitehall inquiry into the incident.

She was posted to the armed forces employment law branch to train soldiers and officers on equality and diversity in 2006. Prince William, during his officer training course at the Royal Military Academy Sandhurst, was amongst those she trained.

Her image was used to promote diversity for the British Army.

Legal battle 

Against advice from fellow officers, Siddique submitted a formal grievance with the Army Board, suing the UK Ministry of Defence for race and sex discrimination in May 2007. When news of the case was leaked, the British press portrayed Siddique as money-grabbing and a medal hunter.

In June 2008, minutes before her case was due to be heard at Central London Employment Tribunal, the UK Ministry of Defence persuaded Siddique to settle out of court. She was awarded an undisclosed sum as damages, a letter of apology and praise about her role at al-Jameat from the Chief of the General Staff, Sir Richard Dannatt.

Post-military career 

For three years Siddique worked as a Crown Advocate in the Counterterrorism Division of the Crown Prosecution Service, specialising in the prosecution of war crimes, crimes against humanity, hate crimes and crimes against the Official Secrets Act. Returning to Perth with her family in 2011, Siddique worked for a year as a senior legal officer in the West Australian Corruption and Crime Commission and for three years as Commissioner's Legal Counsel for the Western Australian Police.

Awards and achievements 

In 2006 Siddique was awarded the Queen's Commendation for Valuable Service for her human rights work in Iraq.

In 2009 she was the Runner-up for Australian Woman of the Year UK.  She is a Telstra Business Women’s Award Finalist and in 2014 was named one of Westpac and the Australian Financial Review's 100 Women of Influence.

In 2015, an audience of 1700 people gave her a standing ovation for her TEDx talk Courage Under Fire, and in 2016 Siddique was a state finalist in the Australian of the Year Awards.

Since 2014, Siddique has gained an international reputation as a powerful and inspiring motivational speaker, thought leader and change agent. A committed human rights advocate and philanthropist, Siddique is patron and ambassador for several not-for-profit and charity organisations.

In 2016 she was appointed as a Director of the International Foundation of Non-Violence.

In 2017 she won the Professional Speakers Australia Breakthrough Speaker of the Year award.

Personal life 

Rabia is mother to triplet sons Aaron, Noah and Oscar.

Major published work 

In 2013 Siddique published her memoir, Equal Justice (Pan Macmillan, 2013). An Australian/UK feature film based on Siddique's memoir is in development.

References

External links 

 Official website
 The One Who Tastes, Knows: An Exclusive Interview With Rabia Siddique
 Army pays out for Anti-Muslim Bias

1971 births
Living people
British Army personnel of the Iraq War
Basra
Australian humanitarians
Recipients of the Commendation for Valuable Service
Australian women lawyers
20th-century Australian lawyers
21st-century Australian lawyers
Australian Muslims